was a temple captured by Oda Nobunaga from the Rokkaku clan in 1568. The Rokkaku tried to take it back in 1570 by cutting off the water supply and placing it under siege. 

Shibata Katsuie, the commander entrusted with defending the temple, led his forces in sallying out of the temple to face the besiegers, succeeding in the end. This action, along with a series of brilliant victories, gained him renown as the "Oni Shibata", or "Demon Shibata".

References

1570 in Japan
Chokoji 1570
Conflicts in 1570
Chokoji 1570